Cassis tuberosa, the king helmet, is a species of very large sea snail with a solid, heavy shell, a marine gastropod mollusc in the family Cassidae, the helmet shells and their allies.

Distribution 
This species occurs in the Western Atlantic Ocean in: North Carolina, Florida, Mexico, Honduras, Colombia, Costa Rica, Panama, Venezuela, Bermuda, Bahamas, Turks & Caicos, Cuba, Hispaniola, Puerto Rico, Virgin Islands, Leeward Islands, Windward Islands, Brazil, and in the Eastern Atlantic Ocean at the Cape Verde Islands.

Description 
The maximum recorded shell length is 301 mm.
The shell of Cassis tuberosa is typically cream colored with dark brown spots. The dorsal surface will have fine growth lines and fine spiral lines to create a "canceled effect".

Habitat 
Its minimum recorded depth is 0 m. and maximum recorded depth is 27 m.
It resides in shallow coastal waters around sandy beaches, as well as reef environments. It lives in tandem with seagrass beds, macroalgae banks, rhodolith beds and coral rubble.

Human use 
The shell of this species has been used for creating cameos.

The attractiveness of the shell is one of the main reasons C. tuberosa is taken for human use. Due to their preference of shallow waters, they are easily accessed by the locality and tourists.

References

External links 
 Malacolog

Cassidae
Gastropods described in 1758
Taxa named by Carl Linnaeus
Molluscs of the Atlantic Ocean